NGC 7057 is an elliptical galaxy located about 230 million light-years away in the constellation of Microscopium. NGC 7057 was discovered by astronomer John Herschel on September 2, 1836.

Group membership
NGC 7057 is a member of a group of galaxies known as the NGC 7060 group. Other members of the group are NGC 7060, NGC 7072 and NGC 7072A.

See also 
 List of NGC objects (7001–7840)
 NGC 7302

References

External links 

Elliptical galaxies
Microscopium
7057
66708
Astronomical objects discovered in 1836